Hakol Over Habibi (Hebrew: הכל עובר חביבי, lit. "Everything goes by, my love"; also known in English as Habibi Group) was an Israeli musical band which represented their country in Eurovision Song Contest 1981 with the song "Halayla". The band consisted of: Shlomit Aharon, Kiki Rothstein, Yuval Dor and Ami Mandelman. They had originally been offered the song "Hallelujah" as a potential Eurovision entry in 1978 but turned it down. The song went on to represent Israel in 1979 but was performed by Milk and Honey winning that year's contest.

History 

The band was formed in 1975, when Amnon Branson produced a performance of songs from the 1950s, directed by Tzadi Tzarfati and under the musical direction of Eldad Sharim . In the show, Branzon combined Aharon, who was the lead singer of the Central Command band, with Dor, Mendelman and Rothstein, who served together in the Artillery Corps band and performed as a band under the name " The Nose and Throat Trio ". The band's name is changed to "Everything Goes Habibi" from the song "Habibi" by Shmuel Fischer .

The great success of the show made the temporary union a fixture. As early as 1976, Naomi Shemer wrote the song "The Celebration Ends" especially for them, which locked up the singing celebration held that year, which replaced the Singing and Choral Festival . In 1979, the band put on a sequel called "The Espresso Generation", which was based on songs from the sixties . That same year, the band received an offer to participate in the Eurovision Song Contest with the song " Hallelujah ", but Aaron refused after receiving an electric shock during the recordings . In place of "Everything Goes Habibi", a milk and honey band was formed that included Gali Atari and a trio of singers, who won the Eurovision with her, and later released many hits.

In December 1979, the band participated in the No. 1 song with the song "Television" (lyrics: Yuval Dor, music: Yuval Dor and Ami Mendelman, arrangement: Eldad Sharim).

In December 1980, the band won first place at the No. 11 Children's Song Festival with the song "Odni Yeled" (lyrics: Edna Peleg, music: Nimrod Tene, arrangement: Uri Karib).

In March 1981, when Aharon was in an advanced stage of pregnancy, the band won first place in the pre-Eurovision with the song " Tonight " and represented Israel at the 1981  Eurovision and in the Eurovision itself itself came in seventh place with the song. In December of that year, the band participated for the second time in a row in the No. 12 children's song festival with the song "Samba's Party" (lyrics: Leah Shilon, melody: Henry Barter, arrangement: Uri Karib). That same year she released an album of children's songs "Still a Child", as the biggest hit out of it. The songs on the album, apart from the theme song, were musically produced by Kobi Oshrat .

In 1982, the band's sixth album "Songs" was released, which included songs that the band recorded between 1980 and 1982. Among the album's songs were Naomi Shemer's songs: "Give a Shoulder", "A Night at Achziv Beach", "On All These" and "The Celebration Ends", the novelty to "Lilac Flower", and the rendition of "Romance", which the band members wrote and composed for Zvika Pick . Eldad Sharim, Uri Karib and Kobi Oshrat arranged the songs for the album. As early as 1982, an evening of appreciation was held for the composer Moshe Wilensky called A Bouquet of Anemones by Moshe Wilensky (and released as an album afterwards). The band sang the song "Autumn" at the event (lyrics: Samson Halafi ). In December 1982 the band participated in Festigal No. 2 with the song Suddenly Sad for Her Lyrics: Avi Koren Composer and Arrangement: Henry Barter.

In early 1983, the band released the album "Crossing the Border" produced by Jaroslav Jakubowicz . The album, which featured hits such as "A Night in a Volume," "Accompany Me" and "Lost Legend," stood out in a more distinctly rocky and jazzy line, and featured the influence of bands such as " Manhattan Transfer ." The songs on the album were widely played on the radio. The album's recordings included Meir Israel and Ahrela Kaminsky on drums and percussion, Alona Toral on keyboards, Ohad Inger on bass guitar, Gili Dor, Gary Eckstein, and Haim Krio on guitars, Dario Malki on synthesizer, Jaroslav Jakubowicz on saxophone, flute and lyric, and other musicians. And in December 1983 of that year, the band was a guest at Festigal No. 3 with the song "Tomorrow the sun will rise" (lyrics: Mirit Shem-Or, music: Zvika Pick, arrangement: Eldad sings

In 1984, the band put on the show "Everything does not go well", to mark a decade of its activity. The show's songs were also recorded for an album of that name. The show and the album included successful songs such as "The Guest" ("Green Tene") and "A Sign We Have Not Arrived" written and composed by Naomi Shemer and "Blues of the Rabbinical Stairs" composed by Yuval Dor to the words of journalist Amnon Dankner .

Attempts to continue the band to a more rocky musical line were unsuccessful, and the album "We'll Live and See", which they released in 1988, failed commercially. From the album came the radio songs: "There are no grapes in the vine", "We will live and see", "If many years" (in all three - lyrics: Natan Zach ), "From another place", "Do not despise" (lyrics Rachel Shapira ). The songs on the album were musically produced by Mickey Gavrielov . In the late 1980s, Aaron retired from the band in favor of an independent career. Aaron was replaced by Etty Carey, who performed with the band in Israel, on many TV shows, and abroad for about 5 years. Later, she was replaced by Etty Carey Sharona Nestovich, with whom the band was released in early 1998 .The album "Who Talks About Love", which failed commercially but left one hit, the theme song, as well as the remake of "Let's Not End Tonight". The band members wrote and composed most of the album, arranged by Viroslav Jakubowicz. This composition with the soloist Nestovich also did not succeed. In 2002, the band ceased its activities, apart from one-time and special performances.

In the winter of 2006, after a long hiatus, the members of the original band, together with Aharon, returned for a tour around Israel, once again directed by Tzadi Tzarfati .

In 2012, the band members returned for a tour, with Yuval Dor replaced by Moshe Siman Tov. The new show, "Longing for Naomi Shemer ", in the musical production of Assaf Amdursky, includes a guest performance by Israel Gurion, Assaf Amdursky and Ohad Hitman, as well as an accompanying orchestra.

Album List 

Everything is going through Habibi 2013 (Yuval Dor was replaced by Moshe Siman Tov)

 Everything Passes Habibi, 1975
 50s hits in Israel and around the world, 1975
 Songs Outside the Show, 1977
 The Espresso Generation, 1979
 Still a Child, 1981
 Poems, 1982
 Crossing the Border, 1983
 My favorite on stage, 1984
 We will live and see, 1988
 Habibi Meitav, 1989 [Collection]
 Classic, 1997 [Collection]
 Who Talks About Love, 1998
 Shlomit Aharon and Everything Passes Habibi - the joint show, 2007
 The Best, 2009 [Collection]

External links 

 Everything goes well, on the MusicBrainz  website (in English)
 Everything goes well, on the Discogs  website (in English)
 Everything goes smoothly, on the Tab4u website
 Everything goes smoothly, on a stereo and mono site
 Everything goes smoothly, on the Hebrew Music Home website
 Everything goes well, on the MOOMA website (in the web archive )
 Everything goes through Habibi - the full story - on Yuval Dor's website

Eurovision Song Contest entrants for Israel
Eurovision Song Contest entrants of 1981
Israeli pop music groups
Musical groups established in 1975